, nicknamed Caju, is an extreme trans-Neptunian object from the scattered disc on a highly eccentric and inclined orbit in the outermost region of the Solar System. It was first observed on 17 January 2015, by astronomers with the Dark Energy Survey at Cerro Tololo Observatory  in Chile. It has been described as an extended scattered disc object (ESDO), and fits into the group of extreme objects that led to the prediction of Planet Nine, and has the highest orbital inclination of any of these objects.

Orbit and classification 

 orbits the Sun at a distance of 35.2–821 AU once every 8856 years (3,234,488 days; semi-major axis of 428 AU). Its orbit has an exceptionally high eccentricity of 0.92 and an inclination of 54° with respect to the ecliptic. This makes it a probable outlier among the known extreme trans-Neptunian objects.

Planet Nine 

 fits into the group of extreme trans-Neptunian objects that originally led to the prediction of Planet Nine. The group consists of more than a dozen bodies with a perihelion greater than 30 AU and a semi-major axis greater than 250 AU, with  having the highest orbital inclination of any of these objects.  Subsequently, unrefereed work by de la Fuente Marcos (2018) found that  current orbital orientation in space is not easily explained by the same mechanism that keeps other extreme trans-Neptunian objects together, suggesting that the clustering in its orbital angles cannot be attributed to Planet Nine's influence. However, regardless of the current direction of its orbit, its high orbital inclination appears to fit into the class of high-semi major axis, high-inclination objects predicted by Batygin & Morbedelli (2017) to be generated by Planet Nine.

Numbering and naming 

The body's observation arc begins with a precovery taken on 27 November 2014 by astronomers with the Dark Energy Survey using the DECam instrument of the Víctor M. Blanco Telescope at Cerro Tololo Inter-American Observatory in Chile. Its discovery was reported in a paper published by Dark Energy Survey astronomers in 2018.

Physical characteristics 

According to Michael Brown and the Johnston's archive,  measures 524 and 584 kilometers in diameter based on an assumed albedo of 0.08 and 0.09, respectively. As of 2018, no rotational lightcurve of has been obtained from photometric observations. The body's rotation period, pole and shape remain unknown.

See also 
 
 Sedna

Notes

References

External links 
 Discovery and Dynamical Analysis of an Extreme Trans-Neptunian Object with a High Orbital Inclination, 14 May 2018
 A New World's Extraordinary Orbit Points to Planet Nine 15 May 2018
 
 

Minor planet object articles (unnumbered)
Discoveries by OSSOS

20151127